Liquid funk, liquid drum & bass, liquid DnB, melodic drum & bass, or sometimes just liquid is a subgenre of drum and bass. While it uses similar basslines and bar layouts to other styles, it contains fewer bar-oriented samples and more instrumental layers (both synthesized and natural), harmonies, melodies and ambiance, producing a sentimental atmosphere directed at home listeners as well as nightclub and rave audiences. Music genres such as jazz, soul and sometimes blues have a pivotal influence on liquid funk.

History

Origins 

In 1999, Fabio alongside Sarah Sandy, began championing a new form of drum and bass they called "liquid funk", with a compilation release of the same name on their Creative Source label. This was characterized by influences from ambient, funk, disco, house and trance music, and widespread use of vocals. Although slow to catch on at first, the style grew massively in popularity around 2003–2004, and by 2005 it was established as one of the biggest-selling subgenres in drum and bass, with labels like Good Looking Records (although this label is strongly cross-genred with atmospheric drum and bass), Hospital Records, Liquid V, Creative Source, Shogun Limited, Fokuz Recordings, and artists like Calibre, Netsky, High Contrast, Logistics, London Elektricity, Nu:Tone, Shapeshifter, DJ Marky, and Solid State among its main proponents.

Liquid funk is very similar to intelligent drum and bass and atmospheric drum and bass, but has subtle differences. Liquid funk has stronger influences from soca, Latin, jazz, disco, breakbeat, and funk music, while intelligent D'n'B or atmospheric D'n'B creates a calmer yet more synthetic sound, using smooth synth lines, deep bass and samples in place of the organic element achieved by use of real instruments.

Continued growth
Liquid music continued its growth from 2006–09, with a rise of artists such as Eveson, Alix Perez, Zero T, Lenzman and Spectrasoul to name a few. Like the Liquid preceding it, it came predominantly from the UK. These artists tended to steer away from the Amens and 808's and brought new sounds to the drum and bass scene.

On 1 October 2007, High Contrast brought liquid funk back to the mainstream with his album, Tough Guys Don't Dance, releasing tracks such as "If We Ever" (featuring Diane Charlemagne) which made Radio 1's Dance singles chart, "Kiss Kiss Bang Bang", and "Tread Softly". This ended up "crossing over" and becoming one of the most listened to drum and bass albums of 2007. The success of liquid funk never left the mainstream, and was followed by Mistabishi's "No Matter What" being played on daytime radio, Chase & Status' More Than Alot album charting and the Brookes Brothers' singles "The Big Blue", "Get On It" and "Loveline" hitting Dance charts.

Liquicity emerged as a YouTube channel in 2008, after 2011 gradually growing out to become a record label and events promoter for new liquid DnB artists, especially in the Netherlands, Belgium and the United Kingdom.

References

External links
 Itstooloud.com: A forum supporting liquid / melodic / intelligent drum and bass music since 2002.
 Planet Liquicity
 LiquidDNB.com: Online community for the liquid drum and bass scene.
 LiquidFunk.ca: Liquid Funk DJ Tedder. Offers info and links to top artists such as Calibre, Condition Red, and more.

Drum and bass subgenres
English styles of music